In military terms, 79th Division may refer to:

Infantry units

79th Division (People's Republic of China)
79th Reserve Division (German Empire)
79th Infantry Division (Wehrmacht), Germany
79th Division (Imperial Japanese Army)
79th Infantry Division (United States)

Other units
79th Armoured Division (United Kingdom)

See also 
List of military divisions by number